Zephyranthes tubispatha, synonym Habranthus tubispathus, the Rio Grande copperlily or Barbados snowdrop, is a species of flowering plant in the family Amaryllidaceae. It is a perennial bulb native to southern South America (Brazil, Argentina, Paraguay and Uruguay). It is widely cultivated as an ornamental and reportedly naturalized in the southeastern United States (Texas, Louisiana, Alabama, Georgia, Florida), much of the West Indies as well as Bermuda, eastern Mexico, India, Easter Island, and central Chile.

Description
As with all former Habranthus species, the flowers are not upright on the stem but held at a slight angle. The leaves are not normally present at flowering time, appearing later; they are narrowly linear.

Chemical composition

Contains toxic lycorine.

Cultivation
Zephyranthes tubispatha tolerates some frost down to  if planted in a sheltered sunny position, but will not survive being frozen. It seeds freely. A form with pinkish flowers is grown as var. rosea, but may be a hybrid.

Z. tubispatha has gained the Royal Horticultural Society's Award of Garden Merit. 
The name Habranthus andersonii is commonly found in horticultural sources.

References

tubispatha
Plants described in 1788
Garden plants
Flora of Brazil
Flora of Chile
Flora of Argentina
Flora of Paraguay
Flora of Uruguay